is a Japanese doujin music circle founded by metal composer Keisuke Kurose and mangaka/illustrator Kachiru Ishizue in the end of 2018.

History 
The music circle Elfensjón was formed in the end of 2018 by Keisuke Kurose who was member in Japanese music groups Asriel and Uroboros prior the formation of the group and manga artist Kachiru Ishizue who has worked on several manga projects including Ilegenes - Kokuyō no Kiseki and Rosen Blood.

The duo is supported by various doujin musicians like vocalist okogeeechann of Adust Rain, guitarist Myu of Imy and violinist Yū. The first EP, entitled Einherjar was released on December 26, 2018. In August of 2019 the group released mini album Ash of Rouge on two CDs which was sold during the Comiket the same year. In the beginning of 2020 Elfensjón were part of a four-split release entitled Veiled including other musicians and doujin circles like Imy, Powerless and ViViX.

In September of 2020 Elfensjón announced the release of their first full-length album called STYX which was released on November 11, 2020. On October 11, 2021 the project announced on YouTube the release of their fourth work entitled Ephemera for a winter 2021 release. A month later the circle released the first single for the upcoming album called Toge. Along with the release of the second single Majo no Naraku on November 23, 2021 it was announced that Ephemera would be released on December 24 the same year with pre-orders starting two weeks prior to the albums release.

Musical style 
The songs of the music circle which are all written in Japanese handling fantastical themes telling a story of the characters Elisia. Astral, Lilith, Seth and Alstroemeria which are relation more or less. Astral and Elisia are siblings hailing from a demon clan who are on a journey searching for the white witch in hopes getting their deepest wish granted. One day, Elisia driven by jealousy kills her brother which was brought to the underworld where he meets with Seth whose duty is to guide the souls of the deceased. Seth himself searches for the soul of Alstroemeria to bring her back to her body ignoring that this is against his task. Astral will later be revived as an immortal by the wish of his sister Elisia granted by the white witch.

The music of the doujin circle mixes Rock, Metal and djent. Due to the usage of anime influences in their music videos and illustrations the circle created the term ′Animecore′ to describe their music. According to Tobias Dahs who reviewed Ephemera for German metal webzine Powermetal.de the sound of the project is influenced by the participating guest members and calls the opener Wiegenlied a strange mixture of J-pop, Babymetal and symphonic tunes while describing the tracks Hrafntinna, Fallen and Undead Sin as a alternitve rock trilogy with straight forward and understandable song structures. Calder Dougherty of Heavyblogisheavy wrote that the guitar playing style is influenced by international progressive and speed metal acts like DragonForce, TesseracT and Periphery. The musical repertoire of the group ranges between tearfull piano and guitar passages, djent-like anime bangers to large ragtime songs, which would even Between the Buried and Me make quit.

Other 
All songs are playable in the rhythm game Osu!.

Discography 
 2018: Einherjar (EP)
 2019: Ash of Rouge (Mini album)
 2020: Veiled (4-way split with Imy, Powerless, ViViX and Masahiro Aoki)
 2020: STYX (album)
 2020: A.namnesis (Acoustic EP, bonus CD released alongside album STYX)
 2021: Ephemera (album)

Members 
Founding members
 Keisuke Kurose: Composing, Arrangements, Producer, Mixing
 Kachiru Ishizue: Illustrations
Studio musicians
 okogeeechann: Vocals
 Hanatan/YURiCa: Vocals
 Kazuya mic: Vocals
 Myu: Guitars
 Kenshiro: Guitars
 Yotu: Keyboards
 Kakeyan: Bass guitar
 Seiichiro Ebisu: Guitars, Bass guitar

References

Weblinks 
 Official homepage
 Elfensjón at Discogs

Japanese symphonic metal musical groups
Japanese gothic rock groups
Japanese alternative rock groups
Musical groups established in 2018
Doujin music